Robert de Pinho de Souza (born 27 February 1981), simply known as Robert, is a Brazilian former footballer who played for as a striker.

Club career

Early career
Born in Salvador, Robert began his professional career with Botafogo de Ribeirão Preto of Brazil, where he played in 2001. He made a move to São Caetano in 2002.
On 14 March 2003, Robert signed for Spartak Moscow on loan until the end of the 2003 season. After less than a season with Spartak, however, he returned to the Americas, signing with Club Atlas. He did exceptionally well in his first season with Atlas, scoring 16 goals in 21 games during the 2004 Clausura. He repeated his performance in the 2004 Apertura, leading them to the semifinals of the liguilla, where they were eliminated by UNAM Pumas.

PSV Eindhoven
Robert moved from Atlas to PSV Eindhoven for £2 million, in January 2005. He made 32 league appearances, scoring 7 goals. During the UEFA Champions League quarter-final match against Olympique Lyonnais, he kept his nerves in check to deliver his decisive spot-kick which sent his team into a semi-final showdown with eventual losing finalist AC Milan. Although he hardly had the time to impress in the Champions League games, he played an excellent match against the Italian giants in the return leg at Philips Stadion, with PSV winning 3–1 and being ousted on away goals, and he himself came close to scoring when he cracked a long range shot which just missed the Milan left post by a matter of inches.

Real Betis
Robert was loaned by PSV to Real Betis for  years for €1 million fee, arriving during the 2006 January transfer window. His signing was pivotal in the efforts of Betis to avoid relegation, scoring 7 La Liga goals, including two against Villarreal in a 2–1 win at El Madrigal and a winning penalty against bitter rivals Sevilla FC in a 2–1 win at the Manuel Ruiz de Lopera. Robert also scored one UEFA Cup goal against AZ Alkmaar. Due to the injury of fellow Brazilian and teammate Ricardo Oliveira, Robert's importance to Betis gradually grew, as he finished the club's top goalscorer for the season. His second season, however, was poorer (still managed 9 league goals in 29 appearances) and he eventually left Real Betis in July 2007, despite Betis excised the option to buy Robert from PSV for €3.25 million on 4 April (effective on 1 July). Moreover, Robert refused to sign a contract, making the transfer collapsed. He joined Al-Ittihad as a free agent. The Court of Arbitration for Sport ruled that despite the collapse of the transfer, Betis still had to pay €1,562,500 as compensation to PSV.

CF Monterrey
On 22 August 2007, Robert signed for Saudi Arabian team Al-Ittihad. On 4 December 2007 Mexican media announced the transfer of Robert to the Mexican football club CF Monterrey, where he was paired up in attack with Chilean goalscorer Humberto "Chupete" Suazo.

Tecos UAG
In Tecos, he had mild success and ended the tournament with only 5 goals. Tecos were eliminated in the quarterfinals and Robert de Pinho was sent to Club America.

Palmeiras
In July 2009, Robert joined Palmeiras and in the Série A he scored 5 goals in 12 matches coming as a substitute in all of them. In 2009, he played a good role as a substitute in the league becoming an important player in the squad.
In 2010 Robert remained with Palmeiras and became the key striker in the team. On 21 February 2010, he scored two headed goals against Paulista rival São Paulo and Palmeiras won the match by 2–0; it was a great appearance for Robert after he had been criticised in the beginning of the Campeonato Paulista, where he scored already 5 goals. On 14 March 2010, Robert completed perfect hat-trick against Santos and Palmeiras won the match by 4–3; this game was marked by the different type of commemoration after goals. By the end of this game, Robert came to be known as "Blade do Palestra" due to his resemblance to actor Wesley Snipes, who played the character Blade in a trilogy of films.

Cruzeiro
On 3 June 2010, Cruzeiro Belo Horizonte signed the striker of Palmeiras property, but he arrived on a six-month-loan from CF Monterrey.

Puebla
It was announced on 8 June 2011 that de Pinho was signed to Puebla. This was made public during the "2011 Super Summer Draft" held in Cancun.

Jeju United
On 16 January 2011, Robert joined South Korean K-League side Jeju United.

References

External links

Profile at Football.fr

1981 births
Living people
Association football forwards
Brazilian footballers
Brazil under-20 international footballers
Brazilian expatriate footballers
Coritiba Foot Ball Club players
Botafogo Futebol Clube (SP) players
Servette FC players
Associação Desportiva São Caetano players
Kawasaki Frontale players
FC Spartak Moscow players
Atlas F.C. footballers
PSV Eindhoven players
Real Betis players
C.F. Monterrey players
Club Puebla players
Jeju United FC players
Ceará Sporting Club players
Club Necaxa footballers
Ittihad FC players
Fortaleza Esporte Clube players
Club América footballers
Tecos F.C. footballers
Avaí FC players
Sociedade Esportiva Palmeiras players
Esporte Clube Bahia players
Boa Esporte Clube players
Sampaio Corrêa Futebol Clube players
Esporte Clube Vitória players
Paraná Clube players
Oeste Futebol Clube players
Grêmio Osasco Audax Esporte Clube players
Santa Cruz Futebol Clube players
Associação Portuguesa de Desportos players
Campeonato Brasileiro Série A players
Campeonato Brasileiro Série B players
Campeonato Brasileiro Série C players
Liga MX players
Eredivisie players
La Liga players
J2 League players
Russian Premier League players
K League 1 players
Saudi Professional League players
Expatriate footballers in Mexico
Expatriate footballers in Japan
Expatriate footballers in Russia
Expatriate footballers in Switzerland
Expatriate footballers in the Netherlands
Expatriate footballers in South Korea
Expatriate footballers in Malta
Expatriate footballers in Saudi Arabia
Brazilian expatriate sportspeople in South Korea
Brazilian expatriate sportspeople in Saudi Arabia
Sportspeople from Salvador, Bahia